Huzurnagar mandal is one of the 23 mandals in Suryapet district of the Indian state of Telangana. It is under the administration of Kodad revenue division with its headquarters at Huzurnagar. It is bounded by Chilkur mandal towards North, Mellachervu mandal and Mattampally mandal towards South, Garidepally Mandal towards west, Kodad mandal towards east.

Geography
It is in the 112 m elevation above sea level.

Demographics
Huzurnagar mandal is having a population of 57,433 living in 13,329 Houses. Males are 29,257 and Females are 28,176. Lakkavaram is the smallest Village and Huzurnagar is the biggest town in the mandal.

Villages and Town 
 census of India, the mandal has 7 settlements.
The settlements in the mandal are listed below:

Notes
(†) Mandal headquarter

References 

Mandals in Suryapet district